Dennis Elías López Beklels (born 2 January 1986) is a Guatemalan international footballer.

Early life 
He was born in Trujillo, Honduras, and was a teacher.

Club career 
He had previously played for Deportes Savio, Deportivo Petapa, Deportivo Mixco and Deportivo Marquense before signing with C.S.D. Municipal in June 2013.

International career

International goals
Scores and results list Guatemala's goal tally first.

Honours 
Municipal
Runner-up
 Liga Nacional de Fútbol de Guatemala (2): 2013–14 Clausura, 2014–15

References

External links 
 

1986 births
Living people
Guatemalan footballers
Guatemala international footballers
C.S.D. Municipal players
Deportivo Petapa players
Deportivo Marquense players
People from Colón Department (Honduras)
Association football defenders
Guatemalan people of Honduran descent
2015 CONCACAF Gold Cup players